DXGM-TV is a commercial television station owned by GMA Network Inc. Its transmitter is located at the Bukagan Hills, Brgy. Malaubang, Ozamiz City. In 1986, GMA Channel 7 Ozamiz was previously launched until it was assigned to MIT-RTVN Inc. in 1998 (based in Pagadian via DXLM-TV Channel 9), an affiliate of ABS-CBN. It transferred to Channel 5 when the network later picked up its frequency.

GMA TV-5 Ozamiz current programs
 One Mindanao (simulcast on TV-5 Davao)
 At Home with GMA Regional TV (simulcast on TV-5 Davao)
 Biyaheng DO30 (simulcast on TV-5 Davao)

See also
List of GMA Network stations

GMA Network stations
Television stations in Misamis Occidental
Television channels and stations established in 1986